Rahlique Devawn Wilks known professionally as Rah Swish (born December 4, 1997) is an American rapper born and raised in Canarsie, Brooklyn. He is known for the hit single Brush Em with Pop Smoke which peaked number 1 on the Bubbling Under Hot 100 Billboard chart 2021.

Early life
Rahlique Devawn Wilks was born on December 4, 1997, in Brooklyn, New York City, in the same area as fellow WOO member Pop Smoke. He grew up listening to 50 Cent, Jay-Z, The Notorious B.I.G. and Lil Wayne. He said in an interview with AllHipHop "It was cool growing up. You don’t really know nothing else so you accept what you’re in. It was calm, it was regular. Street life, young black man growing up in the hood. Regular shit." when asked about growing up in Canarsie, Brooklyn. Swish started rapping in 2016 and began to gain buzz around Brooklyn. "From 2016 on, alright I’m a rapper now." Swish met Pop Smoke in the street when they were doing "street shit", he said in the same AllHipHop interview " We met on the block. I was rapping before him. Once he started rapping, we kept clicking together more and more. It was a vibe. You see Pop, you see Rah."

Music career
He has worked with Fetty Luciano, Pop Smoke, Smokepurpp and many other notable rappers.

Discography

Collaborative albums

Mixtapes

Singles

As lead artist

As featured artist

Other charted and certified songs

Guest Appearances

References 

Living people
1997 births